AL5 may refer to:

 AL5, a postcode district in the AL postcode area
 British Rail Class 85